The 1993–94 NCAA Division III men's ice hockey season began in October 1993 and concluded on March 19 of the following year. This was the 21st season of Division III college ice hockey.

The Presidents of the NESCAC member schools held a vote in 1994 and changed their rules to allow all non-football teams to compete in national tournaments. Though the NESCAC did not sponsor ice hockey at the time, the nine ECAC East schools who were members of NESCAC were now permitted to accept bids to the NCAA Division III Men's Ice Hockey Championship. In part of the new rules, NESCAC members were only allowed to participate in one postseason tournament and, as a result, the teams that finished with leading records would tend to opt out of the conference tournament and hope to receive a bid to the national tournament.

Regular season

Season tournaments

Standings

Note: Mini-game are not included in final standings

1994 NCAA Tournament

Note: * denotes overtime period(s)

See also
 1993–94 NCAA Division I men's ice hockey season
 1993–94 NCAA Division II men's ice hockey season

References

External links

 
NCAA